Angst (in English: fear) is a 2003 German drama film directed by Oskar Roehler, starring André Hennicke, Marie Bäumer and Vadim Glowna. It follows a stage director who goes through a personal crisis.

Cast
 André Hennicke as Robert
 Marie Bäumer as Marie
 Vadim Glowna as Klaus
 Hilde von Mieghem as Brigitte
 Hermann Beyer as Marie's father
 Jutta Hoffmann as Marie's mother
 Christoph Waltz as psychoanalyst
 Herbert Knaup as Wolfgang
  as Markus
 Michaela Hinnenthal as Gregor's mother
 Peter Benedict as dramaturge
 Nina Petri as psychiatrist
 Catherine Flemming as mother
 Eva Habermann as Laura
 Ingrid van Bergen as Hannelore K.

Production
The film was produced through Neue Bioskop Film Produktions & Vertrieb, TV 60 Filmproduktion and Bayerischer Rundfunk. Filming took place in Berlin and Wolfen from 9 April to 5 June 2002.

Release
The film premiered on 14 February 2003 in competition at the 53rd Berlin International Film Festival. It was released in German cinemas by X Verleih on 24 April 2003.

References

External links 

2003 drama films
2003 films
Films directed by Oskar Roehler
Films scored by Martin Todsharow
German drama films
2000s German-language films
2000s German films